Rowghani may refer to:
 Rowghani, Markazi
 Rowghani, Sistan and Baluchestan
 Rowghani, South Khorasan